Statistics of Liberian Premier League in season 1997.

Overview
Liberia Petroleum Refining Company Oilers won the championship.

References
Liberia - List of final tables (RSSSF)

Football competitions in Liberia
Lea